Francisco de Mendavia (died 6 Oct 1540) was a Roman Catholic prelate who served as Bishop of Nicaragua (1537–1540).

Biography
Francisco de Mendavia  was ordained a monk in the Order of Saint Jerome and served as prior of the Monastery of La Victoria in Salamanca. On 5 Dec 1537, he was appointed during the papacy of Pope Paul III as Bishop of Nicaragua. On 2 Aug 1538, he was consecrated bishop.  He served as Bishop of Nicaragua until his death on 6 Oct 1540.

References

External links and additional sources
 (for Chronology of Bishops) 
 (for Chronology of Bishops) 

16th-century Roman Catholic bishops in Nicaragua
1540 deaths
Bishops appointed by Pope Paul III
Hieronymite bishops
Roman Catholic bishops of León in Nicaragua